Belmiro Pentera (born 10 March 1973) is a Portuguese sprint canoeist who competed in the early 1990s. He was eliminated in the semifinals of the K-4 1000 m event at the 1992 Summer Olympics in Barcelona.

References
Sports-Reference.com profile

1973 births
Canoeists at the 1992 Summer Olympics
Living people
Olympic canoeists of Portugal
Portuguese male canoeists
Place of birth missing (living people)